Brett "the Toaster" Williams (born May 23, 1958 in Norfolk, Virginia) is a former Canadian Football League defensive end who played ten seasons for five different teams, as well as in the now defunct USFL, with Birmingham and Memphis. He was a CFL All-Star three times. He was nicknamed "the Toaster" because he also played offense in short yardage situations, thus he would "burn you on both sides" (of the football). Also after William Perry became famous in late 1985, appliance or kitchen-style nicknames became very popular for athletes such as Gerald McNeil being known as the Ice Cube and NBA player Vinnie Johnson being called the Microwave.

References

1958 births
Living people
BC Lions players
Birmingham Stallions players
Canadian football defensive linemen
Edmonton Elks players
Hamilton Tiger-Cats players
Memphis Showboats players
Montreal Alouettes players
Montreal Concordes players
Players of American football from Norfolk, Virginia
Players of Canadian football from Norfolk, Virginia
Shreveport Pirates players